Agesilaus is a minor work by Xenophon. 

The text summarizes the life of King Agesilaus II (c. 440 BC – c. 360 BC) of Sparta, whom Xenophon respected greatly, considering him as an unsurpassed example of all the civil and military virtues. The king's life is narrated in chronological order, making Agesilaus one of the first examples of biographical writings. 

Certain parts of the work are borrowed from Hellenica, with only minor changes of the language.

Notes

External links

 Agesilaus full text in English from Project Gutenberg

Works by Xenophon